During the 1945–46 season Hibernian, a football club based in Edinburgh, came second out of 16 clubs in the Southern Football League.

Southern League

Final League table

Southern League Cup

Group stage

Group C final table

Victory Cup

See also
List of Hibernian F.C. seasons

References

External links
Hibernian 1945/1946 results and fixtures, Soccerbase

Hibernian F.C. seasons
Hibernian